Käte Jaenicke (22 March 1923 – 1 November 2002) was a German theater and film actress. She appeared in more than ninety films from 1954 to 1975.

Personal life
She was in a relationship with writer Aras Ören, and had a daughter Anja Jaenicke (born 9 October 1963 in Berlin) who became an actress. Kate Jaenicke spent her twilight years in a Munich nursing home and died there on 1 November 2002 at 79 years of age. Her final resting place is in the Munich East Cemetery.

Filmography

References

External links 
 
 Käte Jaenicke on Filmportal.de

External links 

1923 births
2002 deaths
German film actresses
German television actresses
20th-century German actresses
People from the Free City of Danzig